The Ambassador from Israel to Estonia is Israel's foremost diplomatic representative in Estonia.

List of ambassadors
Dov Segev-Steinberg (Non-Resident, Helsinki) 2016 - 
Dan Ashbel (Non-Resident, Helsinki) 2011 - 2016
Avi Avraham Granot (Non-Resident, Helsinki) 2007 - 2011
Shemi Tzur

References

Estonia
Israel